The following tables compare general and technical information for a number of notable file managers.

General information

Operating system support

Cross-platform file managers
This table shows the operating systems that the file managers can run on, without emulation.

Mac-only file managers
Finder
ForkLift
Path Finder
Xfile
Commander One

*nix-only file managers
emelFM2
Gentoo file manager
Konqueror
Krusader
nnn
Nautilus
Nemo
PCMan File Manager
Ranger
ROX-Filer
Thunar
SpaceFM

Windows-only file managers
Altap Salamander
Directory Opus
Explorer++
File Manager
Nomad.NET
SE-Explorer
STDU Explorer
Total Commander
File Explorer
xplorer²
XYplorer
ZTreeWin

iOS-only file managers 

 Files (Apple)

Android-only file managers 
 Files by Google
 Ghost Commander

Manager views

Information about what common file manager views are implemented natively (without third-party add-ons).

Note that the "Column View" does not refer to the Miller Columns browsing / visualization technique that can be applied to tree structures / folders.

Twin-panel file managers have obligatory connected panels where action in one panel results in reaction in the second. Konqueror supports multiple panels divided horizontally, vertically or both, but these panels do not act as twin panels by default (the user has to mark the panels he wants to act as twin-panels).

Network protocols
Information on what networking protocols the file managers support. Note that many of these protocols might be supported, in part or in whole, by software layers below the file manager, rather than by the file manager itself; for example, the macOS Finder doesn't implement those protocols, and the Windows Explorer doesn't implement most of them, they just make ordinary file system calls to access remote files, and Konqueror either uses ordinary file system calls or KIO slave calls to access remote files.  Some functions, such as browsing for servers or shares, might be implemented in the file manager even if most functions are implemented below the file manager.

File features
Information on what basic file features the file managers support.

Browsing features

Search features
Information on what file searching features the file managers support. RegExp include the possibilities of nested Boolean searches, thus implicitly all file managers supporting RegExp search support also Boolean searches.

Column Definitions (D)

Entry Notes (s)

Extensibility
Information on which parts of the application can be extended by plugins.

Notes

External links
 What's the best file manager for Ubuntu Gnome 14.04 Trusty? by Rich Lott, May 2014
 Softpanorama Orthodox File Managers page (Home of the OFM standard)
 Comparison of some "light" File Managers in GNU/Linux (in spanish)

File managers